In historiography, historical revisionism is the reinterpretation of a historical account. It usually involves challenging the orthodox (established, accepted or traditional) views held by professional scholars about a historical event or timespan or phenomenon, introducing contrary evidence, or reinterpreting the motivations and decisions of the people involved. The revision of the historical record can reflect new discoveries of fact, evidence, and interpretation, which then results in revised history. In dramatic cases, revisionism involves a reversal of older moral judgments.

At a basic level, legitimate historical revisionism is a common and not especially controversial process of developing and refining the writing of histories. Much more controversial is the reversal of moral findings, whereby what mainstream historians had considered (for example) positive forces are depicted as negative. Such revisionism, if challenged (especially in heated terms) by the supporters of the previous view, can become an illegitimate form of historical revisionism known as historical negationism if it involves inappropriate methods such as the use of forged documents or implausible distrust of genuine documents, attributing false conclusions to books and sources, manipulating statistical data, and deliberately mistranslating texts. This type of historical revisionism can present a re-interpretation of the moral meaning of the historical record. Negationists use the term revisionism to portray their efforts as legitimate historical inquiry; this is especially the case when revisionism relates to Holocaust denial.

Historical scholarship

Historical revisionism is the means by which the historical record, the history of a society, as understood in its collective memory, continually accounts for new facts and interpretations of the events that are commonly understood as history. The historian and American Historical Association member James M. McPherson has said:

In the field of historiography, the historian who works within the existing establishment of society and has produced a body of history books from which he or she can claim authority, usually benefits from the status quo. As such, the professional-historian paradigm is manifested as a denunciative stance towards any form of historical revisionism of fact, interpretation or both. In contrast to the single-paradigm form of writing history, the philosopher of science, Thomas Kuhn, said, in contrast to the quantifiable hard sciences, characterized by a single paradigm, the social sciences are characterized by several paradigms that derive from a "tradition of claims, counterclaims, and debates over [the] fundamentals" of research. On resistance to the works of revised history that present a culturally-comprehensive historical narrative of the US, the perspectives of black people, women, and the labour movement, the historian David Williams said:

After the Second World War, the study and production of history in the US was expanded by the G.I. Bill, which funding allowed "a new and more broadly-based generation of scholars" with perspectives and interpretations drawn from the feminist movement, the Civil Rights Movement, and the American Indian Movement. That expansion and deepening of the pool of historians voided the existence of a definitive and universally-accepted history, therefore, is presented by the revisionist historian to the national public with an history that has been corrected and augmented with new facts, evidence, and interpretations of the historical record. In The Cycles of American History (1986), in contrasting and comparing the US and the Soviet Union during the Cold War (1945–1991), the historian Arthur M. Schlesinger Jr. said:

Revisionist historians contest the mainstream or traditional view of historical events and raise views at odds with traditionalists, which must be freshly judged. Revisionist history is often practiced by those who are in the minority, such as feminist historians, ethnic minority historians, those working outside of mainstream academia in smaller and less known universities, or the youngest scholars, essentially historians who have the most to gain and the least to lose in challenging the status quo. In the friction between the mainstream of accepted beliefs and the new perspectives of historical revisionism, received historical ideas are either changed, solidified, or clarified. If over a period of time, the revisionist ideas become the new establishment status quo a paradigm shift is said to have occurred. The historian Forrest McDonald is often critical of the turn that revisionism has taken but  admits that the turmoil of the 1960s America has changed the way history was written:

Historians are influenced by the zeitgeist (spirit of the time), and the usually progressive changes to society, politics, and culture, such as occurred after the Second World War (1939–1945); in The Future of the Past (1989), the historian C. Vann Woodward said:

Developments in the academy, culture, and politics shaped the contemporary model of writing history, the accepted paradigm of historiography. The philosopher Karl Popper said that "each generation has its own troubles and problems, and, therefore, its own interests and its own point of view".

As the social, political, and cultural influences change a society, most historians revise and update their explanation of historical events. The old consensus, based upon limited evidence, might no longer be considered historically valid in explaining the particulars: of cause and effect, of motivation and self-interest – that tell How? and Why? the past occurred as it occurred; therefore, the historical revisionism of the factual record is revised to concord with the contemporary understanding of history. As such, in 1986, the historian John Hope Franklin described four stages in the historiography of the African experience of life in the US, which were based upon different models of historical consensus.

Negationism and denial

The historian Deborah Lipstadt (Denying the Holocaust: The Growing Assault on Truth and Memory, 1993), and the historians Michael Shermer and Alex Grobman (Denying History: Who Says the Holocaust Never Happened and Why Do They Say It?, 2002), distinguish between historical revisionism and historical negationism, the latter of which is a form of denialism. Lipstadt said that Holocaust deniers, such as Harry Elmer Barnes, disingenuously self-identify as "historical revisionists" in order to obscure their denialism as academic revision of the historical record.

As such, Lipstadt, Shermer, and Grobman said that legitimate historical revisionism entails the refinement of existing knowledge about an historical event, not a denial of the event, itself; that such refinement of history emerges from the examination of new, empirical evidence, and a re-examination, and consequent re-interpretation of the existing documentary evidence. That legitimate historical revisionism acknowledges the existence of a "certain body of irrefutable evidence" and the existence of a "convergence of evidence", which suggest that an event – such as the Black Death, American slavery, and the Holocaust – did occur; whereas the denialism of history rejects the entire foundation of historical evidence, which is a form of historical negationism.

Influences
Some of the influences on historians that may change over time are the following:

Access to new data: much historical data has been lost. Even archives must make decisions based on space and interest on what original material to obtain or to keep. At times, documents are discovered or publicized that give new views of well established events. Archived material may be sealed by governments for many years, either to hide political scandals or to protect information vital for national security. When the archives are opened, they can alter the historical perspective on an event. For example, with the release of the ULTRA archives in the 1970s under the British thirty-year rule, much of the Allied high command tactical decisiomaking process was re-evaluated, particularly the Battle of the Atlantic. Before the release of the ULTRA archives, there was much debate over whether Field Marshal Bernard Montgomery could have known that Arnhem was heavily garrisoned. With the release of the archives, which indicated that they were, the balance of the evidence swung in the direction of his detractors. The release of the ULTRA archives also forced a re-evaluation of the history of the electronic computer. 
 New sources in other languages: as more sources in other languages become available historians may review their theories in light of the new sources. The revision of the meaning of the Dark Ages is an example.
 Developments in other fields of science: DNA analysis has had an impact in various areas of history either confirming established historical theories or presenting new evidence that undermines the current established historical explanation. Professor Andrew Sherratt, a British prehistorian, was responsible for introducing the work of anthropological writings on the consumption of legal and illegal drugs and how to use the papers to explain certain aspects of prehistoric societies. Carbon dating, the examination of ice cores and tree rings, palynology, scanning electron microscope analysis of early metal samples, and measuring oxygen isotopes in bones, have all provided new data in the last few decades with which to argue new hypotheses. Extracting ancient DNA allows historians to debate the meaning and importance of race and indeed current identities.

 Nationalism: for example, in schoolbooks' history on Europe, it is possible to read about an event from completely-different perspectives. In the Battle of Waterloo, most British, French, Dutch and German schoolbooks slant the battle to emphasise the importance of the contribution of their nations. Sometimes, the name of an event is used to convey political or a national perspective. For example, the same conflict between two English-speaking countries is known by two different names: the "American War of Independence" and the "American Revolutionary War". As perceptions of nationalism change, so do the areas of history that are driven by such ideas.  Wars are contests between enemies, and postwar histories select the facts and interpretations to suit their internal needs, The Korean War, for example, has sharply different interpretations in textbooks in the countries involved.

 Culture: for example, as regionalism has regained some of its old prominence in British politics, some historians have suggested that the older studies of the English Civil War were centred on England and that to understand the war, events that had previously been dismissed as on the periphery should be given greater prominence. To emphasise this, revisionist historians have suggested that the English Civil War becomes just one of a number of interlocking conflicts known as Wars of the Three Kingdoms. Furthermore, as cultures develop, it may become strategically advantageous for some revision-minded groups to revise their public historical narrative in such a way so as to either discover, or in rarer cases manufacture, a precedent which contemporary members of the given subcultures can use as a basis or rationale for reform or change.
 Ideology: for example, in the 1940s, it became fashionable to see the English Civil War from a Marxist school of thought. In the words of Christopher Hill, "the Civil War was a class war." After World War II, the influence of Marxist interpretation waned in British academia and by the 1970s this view came under attack by a new school of revisionists and it has been largely overturned as a major mainstream explanation of the mid-17th-century conflict in England, Scotland, and Ireland.
Historical causation: Issues of causation in history are often revised with new research: for example, by the mid-20th century the status quo was to see the French Revolution as the result of the triumphant rise of a new middle class. Research in the 1960s prompted by revisionist historians like Alfred Cobban and François Furet revealed the social situation was much more complex, and the question of what caused the revolution is now closely debated.
 Release of public documents: compared to past decades, a huge volume of archived government records is now available under the thirty-year rule and similar laws. These can provide new sources and therefore new analyses of past events.

Specific issues

Dark Ages
As non-Latin texts, such as Welsh, Gaelic and the Norse sagas have been analysed and added to the canon of knowledge about the period, and as much more archaeological evidence has come to light, the period known as the Dark Ages has narrowed to the point that many historians no longer believe that such a term is useful. Moreover, the term "dark" implies less of a void of culture and law but more a lack of many source texts in Mainland Europe. Many modern scholars who study the era tend to avoid the term altogether for its negative connotations and find it misleading and inaccurate for any part of the Middle Ages.

Feudalism
The concept of feudalism has been questioned. Revisionist scholars led by historian Elizabeth A. R. Brown have rejected the term.

Battle of Agincourt
For centuries, historians thought the Battle of Agincourt was an engagement in which the English army, overwhelmingly outnumbered four to one by the French army, pulled off a stunning victory, a version that was especially popularised by Shakespeare's play Henry V. However, recent research by Professor Anne Curry, using the original enrollment records, has brought into question this interpretation. Though her research is not finished, she has published her initial findings, that the French outnumbered the English and the Welsh only by 12,000 to 8,000. If true, the numbers may have been exaggerated for patriotic reasons by the English.

New World discovery and European colonization of the Americas 
In recounting the European colonization of the Americas, some history books of the past paid little attention to the indigenous peoples of the Americas, usually mentioning them only in passing and making no attempt to understand the events from their point of view. That was reflected in the description of Christopher Columbus having discovered America. Those events' portrayal has since been revised to avoid the word "discovery."

In his 1990 revisionist book, The Conquest of Paradise: Christopher Columbus and the Columbian Legacy, Kirkpatrick Sale argued that Christopher Columbus was an imperialist bent on conquest from his first voyage. In a New York Times book review, historian and member of the Christopher Columbus Quincentenary Jubilee Committee William Hardy McNeill wrote about Sale: 
he has set out to destroy the heroic image that earlier writers have transmitted to us. Mr. Sale makes Columbus out to be cruel, greedy and incompetent (even as a sailor), and a man who was perversely intent on abusing the natural paradise on which he intruded."

McNeill declares Sale's work to be "unhistorical, in the sense that [it] selects from the often-cloudy record of Columbus's actual motives and deeds what suits the researcher's 20th-century purposes." McNeill states that detractors and advocates of Columbus present a "sort of history [that] caricatures the complexity of human reality by turning Columbus into either a bloody ogre or a plaster saint, as the case may be."

New Qing history 

Historians in China and the West long wrote that the Manchus who conquered China and established the Qing dynasty (1636-1912) adopted the customs and institutions of the Han Chinese dynasties that preceded them and were "sinicized", that is, absorbed into Chinese culture. In the late 20th century, historians, especially in the West, explored Manchu language sources and newly accessible imperial archives, and discovered that the emperors retained their Manchu culture and that they regarded China proper as only one part of their larger empire. These scholars differ among themselves but agree on a major revision of the history of the Qing dynasty.

French Revolution

French attack formations in the Napoleonic wars
The military historian James R. Arnold argues:

Argentine Civil Wars
After the proclamation of the Argentine Republic in late 1861, its first de facto President, Bartolomé Mitre, wrote the first Argentine historiographical works: Historia de Belgrano y de la Independencia Argentina and Historia de San Martín y de la emancipación sudamericana. Although these were criticised by notorious intellectuals such as Dalmacio Vélez Sarsfield and Juan Bautista Alberdi and even by some colleagues like Adolfo Saldías, both stated a liberal-conservative bias on Argentine history through the National Academy of History established in 1893, despite the existence of caudillos and gauchos. 

During the Radical Civic Union government of Hipólito Yrigoyen, historians followed the revisionist view of anti-mitrist politicians such as Carlos D'Amico, Ernesto Quesada and David Peña and their theories reached the academy thanks to Dardo Corvalán Mendilharsu. Argentine historical revisionism could reach its peak during the peronist government. In 2011, the Manuel Dorrego National Institute of Argentine and Iberoamerican Historical Revisionism was established by the Secretary of Culture, but this one suffered a rupture between 21st century socialists and nationalists. Three weeks after the Inauguration of Mauricio Macri, the Institute was closed.

World War I

German guilt
In reaction to the orthodox interpretation enshrined in the Versailles Treaty, which declared that Germany was guilty of starting World War I, the self-described "revisionist" historians of the 1920s rejected the orthodox view and presented a complex causation in which several other countries were equally guilty. Intense debate continues among scholars.

Poor British and French military leadership
The military leadership of the British Army during World War I was frequently condemned as poor by historians and politicians for decades after the war ended. Common charges were that the generals commanding the army were blind to the realities of trench warfare, ignorant of the conditions of their men and unable to learn from their mistakes, thus causing enormous numbers of casualties ("lions led by donkeys").<ref>Lions Led By Donkeys
Thompson, P.A. Lions Led By Donkeys: Showing How Victory In The Great War Was Achieved By Those Who Made the Fewest Mistakes  T. Werner Laurie, Ltd. 1st English Edition. 1927
Bournes, John. "Lions Led By Donkeys" , Centre for First World War Studies, University of Birmingham.</ref> However, during the 1960s, historians such as John Terraine began to challenge that interpretation. In recent years, as new documents have come forth and the passage of time has allowed for more objective analysis, historians such as Gary D. Sheffield and Richard Holmes observe that the military leadership of the British Army on the Western Front had to cope with many problems that they could not control, such as a lack of adequate military communications, which had not occurred. Furthermore, military leadership improved throughout the war, culminating in the Hundred Days Offensive advance to victory in 1918. Some historians, even revisionists, still criticise the British High Command severely but are less inclined to portray the war in a simplistic manner with brave troops being led by foolish officers.

There has been a similar movement regarding the French Army during the war with contributions by historians such as Anthony Clayton. Revisionists are far more likely to view commanders such as French General Ferdinand Foch, British General Douglas Haig and other figures, such as American John Pershing, in a sympathetic light.

Reconstruction in the United States
Revisionist historians of the Reconstruction era of the United States rejected the dominant Dunning School that stated that Black Americans were used by carpetbaggers, and instead stressed economic greed on the part of northern businessmen. Indeed, in recent years a "neoabolitionist" revisionism has become standard; it uses the moral standards of racial equality of the 19th century abolitionists to criticize racial policies. "Foner's book represents the mature and settled Revisionist perspective", historian Michael Perman has concluded regarding Eric Foner's Reconstruction: America's Unfinished Revolution, 1863–1877 (1988).

American business and "robber barons"
The role of American business and the alleged "robber barons" began to be revised in the 1930s. Termed "business revisionism" by Gabriel Kolko, historians such as Allan Nevins, and then Alfred D. Chandler emphasized the positive contributions of individuals who were previously pictured as villains. Peter Novick writes, "The argument that whatever the moral delinquencies of the robber barons, these were far outweighed by their decisive contributions to American military [and industrial] prowess, was frequently invoked by Allan Nevins."

Excess mortality in the Soviet Union under Stalin

Prior to the collapse of the Soviet Union and the archival revelations, Western historians estimated that the numbers killed by Stalin's regime were 20 million or higher. After the Soviet Union dissolved, evidence from the Soviet archives also became available and provided information that led to a significant revision in death toll estimates for the Stalin regime, with estimates in the range from 3 million to 9 million.

Guilt for causing World War II

The orthodox interpretation blamed Nazi Germany and Imperial Japan for causing the war. Revisionist historians of World War II, notably Charles A. Beard, said the United States was partly to blame because it pressed the Japanese too hard in 1940 and 1941 and rejected compromises. Other notable contributions to this discussion include Charles Tansill, Back Door To War (Chicago, 1952); Frederic Sanborn, Design For War (New York, 1951); and David Hoggan, The Forced War (Costa Mesa, 1989). The British historian A. J. P. Taylor ignited a firestorm when he argued Hitler was an ineffective and inexperienced diplomat and did not deliberately set out to cause a world war.

Patrick Buchanan, an American paleoconservative pundit, argued that the Anglo–French guarantee in 1939 encouraged Poland not to seek a compromise over Danzig. He further argued that Britain and France were in no position to come to Poland's aid, and Hitler was offering the Poles an alliance in return. Buchanan argued the guarantee led the Polish government to transform a minor border dispute into a major world conflict, and handed Eastern Europe, including Poland, to Stalin. Buchanan also argued the guarantee ensured the country would be eventually invaded by the Soviet Union, as Stalin knew the British were in no position to declare war on the Soviet Union in 1939, due to their military weakness.

The dropping of atomic bombs on Hiroshima and Nagasaki

The atomic bombings of Hiroshima and Nagasaki have generated controversy and debate. Historians who accepted President Harry Truman's reasoning in justifying dropping atomic bombs in order to force Japanese surrender end of World War II are known as "orthodox," while "revisionists" generally deny that the bombs were necessary. Some also claim that Truman knew they were not necessary but wanted to pressure the Soviet Union. These historians see Truman's decision as a major factor in starting the Cold War. They and others also may charge that Truman ignored or downplayed predictions of casualties.

Cold War

Historians debate the causes and responsibility for the Cold War. The "orthodox" view puts the major blame on the Soviet Union, while a "revisionist" view puts more responsibility on the United States. 

Vietnam WarAmerica in Vietnam (1978), by Guenter Lewy, is an example of historical revisionism that differs much from the popular view of the U.S. in the Vietnam War (1955–75) for which the author was criticized and supported for belonging to the revisionist school on the history of the Vietnam War. Lewy's reinterpretation was the first book of a body of work by historians of the revisionist school about the geopolitical role and the U.S. military behavior in Vietnam.

In the introduction, Lewy said:

Other reinterpretations of the historical record of the U.S. war in Vietnam, which offer alternative explanations for American behavior, include Why We Are in Vietnam (1982), by Norman Podhoretz, Triumph Forsaken: The Vietnam War, 1954–1965 (2006), by Mark Moyar, and Vietnam: The Necessary War (1999), by Michael Lind.

 Chronological revisionism 
It is generally accepted that the foundations of modern chronology were laid by the humanist Joseph Scaliger. Isaac Newton in his work The Chronology of Ancient Kingdoms made one of the first attempts to revise the "Scaligerian chronology". In the twentieth century the "revised chronology" of Immanuel Velikovsky can be singled out in this direction, perhaps it initiated a wave of new broad interest in the revision of chronology. The materials of the "New Chronology", a proposed revision of eras by academician Anatoly Fomenko, albeit one widely rejected by mainstream scholars as pseudoscience, show many old historical images with dates indicating the addition of a supplemental millennium in calendars in use in the Christian world a few centuries ago.

In general, many near-academic revisionist chronological theories suggest halving the duration of the Christian era, or consider certain historical periods to be erroneously dated, such as Heribert Illig's Phantom time hypothesis. At the same time, contemporary non-academic researchers often propose a more radical revision. For example, the model of chronology reconstruction of the revisionist  reduces the entire known written history to several centuries. At the same time, other non-academic revisionists, thanks to publicly available sources, question the historical reliability of the person of Joseph Scaliger himself.

See also
 Damnatio memoriae Denialism
 Official history
 Pseudohistory
 Selective omission

Cases of revisionism
 The 1619 Project, a revisionist look at American history with a focus on slavery and its legacy
 Afrocentrism, historical scholarship with a focus on African peoples
 Christ myth theory, a revisionist theory that Jesus never existed
 Donation of Constantine, exposure of a forgery
 Historical revision of the Inquisition
 New Historians, a group of Israeli historians with alternative views about Israel's history
 Revisionism (Spain)
 Revisionist school of Islamic studies

References
Informational notes

Citations

Further reading
 Banner, Jr., James M. (2021). The Ever-Changing Past: Why All History Is Revisionist History. Yale University Press. .
 Burgess, Glenn (1990). "On Revisionism: An Analysis of Early Stuart Historiography in the 1970s and 1980s." Historical Journal, vol. 33. no. 3, pp. 609–627. .
 Comninel, George C. (1987). Rethinking the French Revolution: Marxism and the Revisionist Challenge. Verso.
 Confino, Michael (2009). "The New Russian Historiography, and the Old—Some Considerations." History & Memory, vol. 21, no. 2, pp. 7–33.  .
 Gaither, Milton (2012). "The Revisionists Revived: The Libertarian Historiography of Education." History of Education Quarterly, vol. 52, no. 4, pp. 488–505.
 Jainchill, Andrew, and Samuel Moyn (2004). "French Democracy Between Totalitarianism and Solidarity: Pierre Rosanvallon and Revisionist Historiography." Journal of Modern History, vol. 76, no. 1, pp. 107–154. .
 Kopecek, Michal (2008). Past in the Making: Historical Revisionism in Central Europe After 1989. Central European University Press.
 Kort, Michael (2007). "The Historiography of Hiroshima: The Rise and Fall of Revisionism." New England Journal of History, vol. 64, no. 1, pp. 31–48.
 Lenin, V.I. (1908). "Marxism and Revisionism." Karl Marx—1818-1883 (symposium).
 Markwick, Roger (2001). Rewriting History in Soviet Russia: The Politics of Revisionist Historiography 1956–1974. Springer.
 Melosi, Martin V. (1983). "The Triumph of Revisionism: The Pearl Harbor Controversy, 1941-1982." Public Historian, vol. 5, no. 2, pp. 87–103. .
 Palmer, William (2010). "Aspects of Revision in History in Great Britain and the United States, 1920–1975." Historical Reflections/Réflexions Historiques, vol. 36, no. 1, pp. 17–32. .
 Riggenbach, Jeff (2009). Why American History Is Not What They Say: An Introduction to Revisionism. Auburn, Alabama: Ludwig von Mises Institute.
 Rothbard, Murray N. (February 1976). "Revisionism and Libertarianism." Libertarian Forum, pp. 3-6.
 Viola, Lynne (2002). "The Cold War in American Soviet Historiography and the End of the Soviet Union." Russian Review'', vol. 61, no. 1, pp. 25–34. .

External links

 
Revisionism